Die schnelle Gerdi is a German television series about a female taxi driver. The first season is set in Munich and aired in 1989. A second season played in Berlin 2002.

See also
List of German television series

External links
 

1989 German television series debuts
1989 German television series endings
Television shows set in Munich
2002 German television series debuts
2002 German television series endings
Television shows set in Berlin
German-language television shows
ZDF original programming